On September 8, 1973, a Douglas DC-8 operated by World Airways as World Airways Flight 802 crashed on high ground while on approach to Cold Bay Airport, Alaska, killing all six people on board.

The official accident investigation  concluded that the probable cause was the captain's non-adherence to published instrument approach procedures for the destination airport.

History of the flight 
Flight 802 was a contract cargo flight for the US Military Airlift Command from Travis AFB, California, to Clark AFB, Philippines; Cold Bay was the first planned stopover. The flight crew consisted of captain John A. Weininger (52), first officer Gregg W. Evans (27), and flight engineer Robert W. Brocklesby (46), while on board were also three non-revenue passengers, including two company employees.

The aircraft operating flight 802 was a four-engine Douglas DC-8-63CF jetliner, registration  which had entered service two years earlier, in 1971. Maintenance records for the aircraft did not highlight any significant problem.

Final descent and crash 

References 

Aviation accidents and incidents in the United States in 1973
World Airways accidents and incidents
1973 in Alaska
Accidents and incidents involving the Douglas DC-8
Airliner accidents and incidents involving controlled flight into terrain
September 1973 events in the United States